Leith Citadel, renamed in 1952 from North Leith, was an early railway terminus in Leith, Scotland. It was on Commercial Street, near the Leith Docks.

History

The Edinburgh, Leith and Granton Railway constructed a branch to North Leith (Leith Citadel) which was opened on 10 May 1846. It served as a terminus in terms of passenger traffic but a freight-only branch on its west side continued into Leith Docks.

It was designed by Grainger & Miller and being one of the earliest railway structures it adopts a Georgian rather than "Victorian railway" style.

It closed (except for the side branch) in 1947. It was converted into a pub called the "Steamboat Inn" around 1950 which closed around 1980 when it was then restored by the Scottish Development Agency as one of the "Leith Project" schemes for community use.

Today
Leith Citadel station is a Category B listed building and is one of the remaining structures from the original line. It is now used as the Citadel Youth Centre.

References

External links
 Citadel Youth Centre

Disused railway stations in Edinburgh
Category B listed buildings in Edinburgh
Railway stations in Great Britain opened in 1846
Railway stations in Great Britain closed in 1947
Former North British Railway stations
1846 establishments in Scotland
History of Leith